is the 13th single by Pink Lady. It was released on 5 July 1979, with a peak position on the Oricon charts of #4, and also a #4 position on the Japanese Music Labo chart. It was also the duo's last top-five single.

The B-side, an alternate version of the song used on their Magical Music Tour studio album, features members of The Beach Boys on backing vocals.

The single was also featured on the Japanese music program The Best Ten, where it peaked at #7. It sold approximately 550,000 copies.

Track listing (7" vinyl)

Personnel for U.S.A. version
 Mike Love, Brian Wilson, Carl Wilson, Bruce Johnston, and Paul Fauerso - Backing vocals
 Eddie Tuduri - Drums
 Ed Carter - Guitar & bass
 Paul Fauerso - Keyboards & percussion

Chart positions

References

External links
 
 

1979 singles
1979 songs
Pink Lady (band) songs
Japanese-language songs
Surf songs
Songs with lyrics by Yū Aku
Songs with music by Shunichi Tokura
Victor Entertainment singles